Phytometra ernestinana, Ernestine's moth, is a species of moth of the family Erebidae. It is found in North America, where it has been recorded from Alabama, Arizona, Florida, Georgia, Illinois, Indiana, Iowa, Kansas, Louisiana, Michigan, Mississippi, New York, North Carolina, Ohio, Oklahoma, Ontario, South Carolina, Tennessee, Texas and Wisconsin. It is also present in Cuba.

The wingspan is about 18 mm. Adults have been recorded on wing year round in Florida.

References

Boletobiinae
Moths described in 1840